Methan Mani is a clock tower which stands next to the Padmanabha Swamy Temple, East Fort, Thiruvananthapuram in the south west Indian state of Kerala. It is a historic landmark and a tourist attraction.

Location
The "Methan Mani" is located near the Padmanabha Swamy Temple in Thiruvananthapuram. To see it, one has to stand before the temple entrance and look in the opposite direction of the Padmatheertha pond. It is on the top of the Old Fort Palace.
The unique feature of the clock is the presence of a bearded man on top of the dial who opens his mouth corresponding to every hour when two rams hit his cheek and forcing him to close his mouth. This action is coordinated with the hourly chimes.

Present
The clock works perfectly, and strikes each hour in a day. The Methan Mani remains a popular landmark in the city with the chimes audible around the locality.
There was a web version of the clock released in 2004 by the Centre for Development of Imaging Technology (C-Dit), which is offline currently.

References

External links 
Methan mani online

Buildings and structures in Thiruvananthapuram
Clock towers in India